The Pseudoalteromonadaceae are a small family of Pseudomonadota.

References

External links

Alteromonadales